EatStreet Inc. is an American online food ordering service that acts as a centralized marketplace, where diners can order delivery and takeout from restaurants in their area. Founded in 2010 in Madison, Wisconsin, the company has expanded to over 15,000 restaurants in over 150 markets nationwide. In addition to the online ordering platform, EatStreet also offers restaurants custom websites, mobile apps, Facebook ordering, and digital marketing services.

History

Initially launched by three University of Wisconsin–Madison students, co-founders Matt Howard, Eric Martell, and Alex Wyler on February 1, 2010, the company began as BadgerBites and operated solely in Madison, Wisconsin. In August 2011, the company began expanding into additional markets, focusing on tier 2 and 3 cities, especially those with colleges and universities.

After launching fifteen sister sites to BadgerBites, the company launched a redesigned website to consolidate all of their restaurants and markets as well as begin national expansion under the new name "EatStreet” on January 21, 2013. In February 2013, the company raised $2.45 million in a Series A investment round. Later that year, EatStreet was named the #2 "Food Delivery Startup to Watch" by StrategyEye  and CEO Matt Howard was named to Madison Magazine'''s 2013 "M List" honoring entrepreneurial excellence.

In early 2014, EatStreet partnered with the National Restaurant Association as part of the association's Extreme Digital Makeover promotion. EatStreet partnered with Yelp in June 2014 to allow online users to order food directly from Yelp's restaurant pages. A few months later, EatStreet's Series B funding reached a total of $8.4 million in February 2014.

In spring of 2015, Howard, Martell and Wyler were named finalists for the EY Entrepreneur Of The Year Award in the Midwest. In December of the same year, EatStreet secured a Series C investment round, totaling $26 million.

EatStreet was named one of Madison's top places to work by Madison Magazine'' in September 2016, drawing comparisons to Silicon Valley-based companies for their authentic tech startup culture.

In fall of 2017, EatStreet's Howard and Wyler were named to Forbes 30 Under 30 in Consumer Technology.

In February 2017, EatStreet implemented their own delivery services in ten cities following their acquisition of Philadelphia-based food delivery company, Zoomer. As of May 2017, the company employs roughly 200 corporate employees and over 800 delivery drivers. The company is venture-backed.

Data breach 
In 2019 EatStreet had a data breach and information including names, phone numbers, email addresses, and routing numbers for restaurants and delivery services, in addition to EatStreet customer information including names, last four credit card numbers, expiration dates, billing addresses, email addresses, and phone numbers were accessed. The criminal claimed to have access to six million accounts.

According to the disclosure EatStreet released in July 2019, the unauthorized party breached its computer network on May 3 and proceeded to access and download information from its database, until May 17, when the company discovered the intrusion.

References

External links 
 

Online food retailers of the United States
American companies established in 2010
Retail companies established in 2010
Transport companies established in 2010
Internet properties established in 2010
Companies based in Madison, Wisconsin
2010 establishments in Wisconsin